The Union of Soviet Socialist Republics (Soviet Union) competed at the 1988 Winter Olympics in Calgary, Alberta, Canada.  It would be the last Winter Olympic Games before the dissolution of the USSR in 1991.  Six of the former Soviet republics would compete together as the Unified Team at the 1992 Winter Olympics, and each republic would be independently represented at subsequent Games.

The Soviet Union had its best showing at the Winter Olympics in terms of total medals (overtaking its 1976 result with 27 medals) and second-best in terms of gold medals (after the aforementioned 1976 result with 13 gold medals).

Medalists

Competitors
The following is the list of number of competitors in the Games.

Alpine skiing

Men

Men's combined

Women

Women's combined

Biathlon

Men

Men's 4 x 7.5 km relay

Bobsleigh

Cross-country skiing

Men

 C = Classical style, F = Freestyle

Men's 4 × 10 km relay

Women

 C = Classical style, F = Freestyle

Women's 4 × 5 km relay

Figure skating

Men

Women

Pairs

Ice dancing

Ice hockey

First round
Top three teams (shaded ones) advanced to the medal round.

 Soviet Union 5-0 Norway
 Soviet Union 8-1 Austria
 Soviet Union 7-5 USA
 West Germany 3-6 Soviet Union
 Soviet Union 6-1 Czechoslovakia

Medal round
The top three teams from each group play the top three teams from the other group once. Points from previous games against their own group carry over.

 Soviet Union 5-0 Canada
 Soviet Union 7-1 Sweden
 Finland 2-1 Soviet Union

Luge

Men

Men's doubles

Women

Nordic combined 

Men's individual

Events:
 normal hill ski jumping 
 15 km cross-country skiing 

Men's team

Three participants per team.

Events:
 normal hill ski jumping 
 10 km cross-country skiing

Ski jumping

Speed skating

Men

Women

References

Official Olympic Reports
International Olympic Committee results database
 Olympic Winter Games 1988, full results by sports-reference.com

Nations at the 1988 Winter Olympics
1988
Winter Olympics